Perelman is a surname.

Perelman may also refer to:
Perelman School of Medicine at the University of Pennsylvania
50033 Perelman, asteroid named after Grigori Perelman
Perel'man (crater), lunar crater named after Yakov Perelman